United Farmers may refer to:

The United Farmers' MPs in the Canadian House of Commons who founded the Progressive Party of Canada in 1920
United Farmers of Alberta, a political party which governed Alberta from 1921 to 1935 and also elected members nationally, and which remains in existence as a farmers' organization
United Farmers of British Columbia, ran two candidates in the 1920 provincial election and helped form the Provincial Party of British Columbia
United Farmers of Canada, a Saskatchewan-based farmers' union formed in 1926
United Farmers of Manitoba, a farmers' organization and political party which won the 1922 provincial election and became the Progressive Party of Manitoba
United Farmers of New Brunswick, a political party
United Farmers of Nova Scotia, a political party
United Farmers of Ontario, a political party which governed Ontario from 1919 to 1923 and also elected members nationally
United Farmers of Quebec (Fermiers unis du Québec), which became the Parti fermier-progressiste du Québec (Progressive Farmers of Quebec) political party
United Farmers of Saskatchewan, a political party

See also  
United Farm Workers
Farmers' Party (disambiguation)

 
Social democratic parties in Canada
Progressivism in Canada
Agrarian politics